Nothing Lasts Forever is a 1984 American science fiction comedy-drama film written and directed by Tom Schiller. Shortly before its intended release date of September 1984, Metro-Goldwyn-Mayer postponed it. The film has never been officially released theatrically or for home media in the United States. The film was uploaded by a fan onto the Internet video website YouTube, but was taken down at the insistence of Turner Entertainment, the copyright owner of the pre-1986 MGM film library. 
It was eventually broadcast on Warners's cable TV network Turner Classic Movies.

It stars Zach Galligan and Lauren Tom in the lead roles, with a supporting cast including Bill Murray, Dan Aykroyd, Sam Jaffe and Mort Sahl.  John Belushi was to appear in the film, but he died six weeks before production began.

The making of the film, through interviews with Tom Schiller, Lorne Michaels, Zach Galligan, Lauren Tom, Bill Murray and others involved with the film, is chronicled in the book Nothing Lost Forever: The Films of Tom Schiller by Michael Streeter (BearManor Media, 2005).

Plot 
The film opens to Adam Beckett reluctantly performing as a purported pianist to an audience in New York City. When Beckett gives away that he is using a player piano, the outraged crowd storms the stage and wraps Beckett with the piano rolls. 

Adam awakes on a train in Europe and realizes it was a nightmare. He is accosted by a Swedish architect, to whom he explains his stymied dreams of becoming an artist. After encouragement from him, Adam resolves to return to America to follow his dream. Upon returning, he discovers that the Port Authority has taken control of New York and is restricting entry into the city.

Upon failing a drawing test at the Port Authority, Adam is forced to work in a menial job under a trigger-happy boss. He has to watch traffic before it enters the Holland tunnel and prevent vehicles from entering with faulty parts, such as a headlight out. 

Feeling he won't be creative living under his aunt and uncle's roof, Adam moves to a hotel. He is given a room whose last occupant disappeared mysteriously, leaving all of his belongings behind, including several paintings. 

At work Adam meets Mara, a fellow aspiring artist. He tags along with her to SoHo and she takes it upon herself to expose them to lots of different art forms to determine which most appeals to each of them.  

His kindness to a tramp leads him to be taken into an underground network where he is first cleansed by fire, then discovers that the city's tramps are controlling the destiny of all the cities in the world. They instruct him to travel to the moon on a mission.

When Adam returns above ground he goes immediately to Mara's, but she is indifferent to him. Upset, he hurries to the city bus bound for the moon.

In transit, the bus has higher levels, one for dancing, one for dinner. Adam is the youngest by far, and one of the older ladies tells him they all have chips implanted in the back of their necks. It causes them to say Miami rather than moon when they speak of the trip.

Upon arrival the bus is greeted by the Moon Maidens and Iloy, meant to be Adam's true love, who tells him it's too dangerous to talk. Adam jumps off the shuttle heading to the shopping at Moon-o-Rama and Iloy picks him up with a buggy to take him out of Consumerzone. 

When the conductor finds Adam, he's knocked out. Coming to, he's told he must hurry to his concert in Carnegie Hall. After playing a piece receiving a standing ovation, he looks up to an opera box to see Iloy.

Release 
Shortly before the scheduled release date, Metro-Goldwyn-Mayer announced Nothing Lasts Forever was being postponed. MGM never released the film theatrically, nor has it ever been available on home  video in any format in the United States. However, the film has been broadcast on TV networks, on BBC2 in the UK in 1994 as part of the Moviedrome strand, in Italy under the title "Nente dura per sempre", in Germany under the title "Alles ist vergänglich" and on Dutch television network RTL5 in November 1993. Warner Bros., which now owns the rights to the pre-1986 MGM film library stated in 2003 and again in February 2006, that the film cannot be released on DVD due to unspecified "legal difficulties". Bill Murray and Dan Aykroyd have both agreed to take part in DVD special features, should the film finally be released.

In 2011 the film was leaked onto YouTube.

The film made its American television debut on the cable network Turner Classic Movies on January 4, 2015 as part of their "TCM Underground" programming block.

Screenings 
Murray and Schiller held a screening of the film on April 13, 2004, at the BAM Cinematek in Brooklyn, New York. On September 6, 2005, Murray, Schiller and Zach Galligan attended another screening, this time at Lincoln Center's Walter Reade Theater. The screening was followed by a Q&A session and a book signing of Nothing Lost Forever: The Films of Tom Schiller. The film was next screened on November 12, 2005, at the St. Louis International Film Festival. On January 28, 2006, Schiller introduced a screening at the Eastman House's Dryden Theatre in Rochester, New York. Schiller was again present for an August 22, 2007 screening at the Cinema Arts Center of Huntington, New York. The film was shown on November 6, 2009, at Olympia's Capitol Theater as part of the opening night of the Olympia Film Festival. On April 1, 2010, it screened in Los Angeles, California at Grauman's Egyptian Theatre in Hollywood as part of the American Cinematheque's acknowledgment of "criminally unknown" films, with Schiller attending and answering questions. On September 27, 2014, Schiller attended a screening of the film, followed by a Q&A at Sunray Cinema in Jacksonville, Florida.

References

External links 
 
 
 Nothing Lost Forever - a book about Tom Schiller and this film.
 Official trailers on YouTube

1984 films
1980s science fiction comedy-drama films
1980s English-language films
Unreleased American films
Films directed by Tom Schiller
Films scored by Howard Shore
American black-and-white films
American science fiction comedy-drama films
Metro-Goldwyn-Mayer films
Films produced by Lorne Michaels
Moon in film
1984 directorial debut films
1984 comedy films
1984 drama films
1980s American films